is a comical gothic-themed platform game video game, and a spinoff to Castlevania. It is a remake and sequel to the 1990 Famicom game . Konami released the title for the Game Boy in 1993 in Japan and North America.

Plot
This game is a sequel to the events of the original Kid Dracula. Galamoth (called Garamoth in the game) has returned and it is up to Kid Dracula to stop him once again. However, he seems to have forgotten most of his spells. Also, many of his minions have turned against him and joined Galamoth. Death remains by his side however, and gives him tips and heirlooms from his father, Dracula, along the way.

Audio 
The main musical theme is adapted from Claude Debussy's Golliwogg's Cakewalk.

References

1993 video games
Child superheroes
Fantasy video games
Game Boy games
Game Boy-only games
Mobile games
Parody video games
Platform games
Single-player video games
Video games about children
Video games developed in Japan
Castlevania spin-off games